The Wawona Tunnel is a highway tunnel in Yosemite National Park. It, and Tunnel View just beyond its east portal, were completed in 1933.

Wawona Tunnel is named after the community of Wawona but its name origin is not known. A popular story claims Wawō'na was the Miwok word for "big tree", or for "hoot of the owl", a bird considered the sequoia trees' spiritual guardian.

Route
Wawona Tunnel was bored through solid granite bedrock, and carries Wawona Road through a granite mountain on the south side of the Merced River. It is located on one of the three main roads providing access to Yosemite Valley, the most visited section of the park. Wawona Road becomes California State Route 41 on exiting the park.

Specifications

A $1.5 million federal highway contract to repair the tunnel's ventilation and electrical systems, and a separate contract to upgrade visitor services at Tunnel View, was completed in 2008.

Scenery
The Wawona Tunnel features in a monochrome photograph by Ansel Adams: From Wawona Tunnel, Winter, Yosemite, about 1935.

See also
List of tunnels documented by the Historic American Engineering Record in California
National Register of Historic Places listings in Yosemite National Park
Tunnel View

References

External links

Vehicle Restrictions, National Park Service
Photo of Department of Agriculture Survey Plaque — dated 1936 and giving the tunnel's length as 4358.91 feet.
Photo of ventilation fans, The Digital Ark Corporation

Transportation buildings and structures in Mariposa County, California
Buildings and structures in Yosemite National Park
Historic American Engineering Record in California
History of Mariposa County, California
Road tunnels in California
1933 establishments in California
Tunnels completed in 1933
National Park Service rustic in Yosemite National Park